The Kovin Bridge is a road bridge in Serbia, across the Danube, between the cities of Kovin and Smederevo.

See also
 List of bridges in Serbia
 List of crossings of the Danube

References

Bridges over the Danube
Road bridges in Serbia
Bridges completed in 1976